F40, F.40, or F-40 may refer to:

Transportation

Aircraft
 Farman F.40, a French pusher biplane reconnaissance aircraft
 Hirth F-40, a German aircraft engine
 F40, the NATO code for the JP-4 jet fuel

Automobiles
 Beijing F40, a Chinese subcompact pickup truck
 Ferrari F40, an Italian mid-engine sports car
 BMW 1 Series (F40), a German subcompact hatchback
 GM F40 transmission, a car gearbox

Trains
 EMD F40C, an American diesel-electric locomotive
 EMD F40PH, an American diesel locomotive

Watercraft
 Brazilian frigate Niterói (F-40), a Niteroi-class frigate of the Brazilian Navy
 HMS Jervis Bay (F40), a British armed merchant cruiser
 HMS Roberts (F40), a Roberts-class monitor of the Royal Navy
 HMS Sirius (F40), a Leander-class frigate of the Royal Navy
 INS Talwar (F40), the lead ship of the Talwar-class frigates of the Indian Navy

Other uses
 F40 (classification), a disability sport classification for athletes of short stature
F40 (full name F40T12) is a common size fluorescent lamp, at 4 foot or 1.2m